Goldengirl is a 1979 American drama sci-fi sports film directed by Joseph Sargent, based on the 1977 science fiction novel of the same title by Peter Lear, a pseudonym of Peter Lovesey. The screenplay was by John Kohn, with music by Bill Conti. The film is the screen debut of Susan Anton, who starred in the title role opposite James Coburn.

Plot
A scientist and neo-Nazi doctor named Serafin has developed a way to create a physically superior human being. He tests it out on his adopted daughter, Goldine.

From childhood, Goldine's father has injected her with vitamins and hormones. Now that she is grown, it is time to give her a test run. Serafin declares that his "Goldengirl" will enter and win three races at the 1980 Summer Olympics in Moscow.

To subsidize his work, Serafin sells shares in his daughter's future to a syndicate of businessmen, who send merchandising expert Dryden to look out for their interests. Goldine's personal and emotional development, meanwhile, is left in the hands of a psychologist, Dr. Sammy Lee.

Goldine competes in Moscow, with unexpected results.

Cast
 James Coburn as Dryden
 Susan Anton as Goldine
 Curt Jurgens as Serafin
 Harry Guardino as Valenti
 Ward Costello as Cobb
 Michael Lerner as Stenberg
 Leslie Caron as Dr. Sammy Lee
 James A. Watson Jr. Winters
 John Newcombe as Armitage
 Julianna Fjeld as Ingrid 
 Robert Culp as Esselton
 Nicolas Coster as Dr. Dalton
 Sheila Wills as Jackson (as Sheila DeWindt)
 Annette Tannader as Krull
 Mischa Hausserman as Pilot
 Tony Brande as Vince 
 Michelle Hooper as Muratova
 Jeff Vanderstock as Starter #1 (as Geoff Vanderstock)
 Ben Pollock as Starter #2
 Nazaret Khodiquian as Starter #3
 Elliott Mason as Makepeace
 Jenny Sullivan as Dr. Walsh
 Karen Werner as Kansas Girl
 Andrea Brown as Teammate 
 Casey MacDonald as Reporter
 Theresa Aldrich Fagundes as Reporter (as Theresa Aldrich)
 Gilbert Green as Dr. Hatrwig
 Darren Dublin as Reporter
 Joyce Danelen as Reporter
 Gil Smith as Reporter
 Bob Beamon as Colorman
 Dwight E. Stones as Philip

Production
Susan Anton was a winner of Miss California and second runner-up in the 1969 Miss America pageant. She was best known for starring and singing in TV commercials for Muriel Cigars. Anton earned a 1980 Golden Globe nomination for Best New Star of the Year in a Motion Picture—Female.

Olympic track-and-field stars Dwight Stones and Bob Beamon make cameo appearances in the film, as does Australian tennis player John Newcombe.

The film raised two-thirds of its $7 million budget by pre-selling the TV rights; NBC planned to broadcast an expanded 184-minute, two-part miniseries version that would air in conjunction with the network's exclusive coverage of the 1980 Moscow Olympics. After US participation was canceled in protest of the Soviet invasion of Afghanistan, NBC postponed the broadcast until January 8, 1981 when it aired a 117-minute version in a three-hour timeslot.

Reception
Vincent Canby of The New York Times, called the film "a very intelligent movie of its kind, written and directed in the same brisk style that marked Mr. Sargent's earlier Colossus: The Forbin Project," as well as "a wittily conceived and executed movie that, with the straightest of faces, manage to satirize the kind of big business that surrounds so-called amateur sports today."  A review in Variety said, "'Goldengirl' is amusingly poor ... Central fault to film is Anton's character, who seems to alternate between robot, country girl and schizophrenic. Her screen debut is at best, forgettable, with Anton doing little to clear up the mystifying script." Gene Siskel of the Chicago Tribune gave the film 1 star out of 4 and wrote, "The idea isn't a bad one; it's even plausible. But the script is laughable. The doctor and businessman are fearful, cartoon figures; they never are particularly slick or menacing. Only James Coburn as an advertising agent brings any credibility to a role. And this is not accomplished by anything written for Coburn; he simply earns our good will through his infectious smile." Kevin Thomas of the Los Angeles Times wrote that the film "starts out promisingly enough but falls apart halfway through ... The film is extremely uneven, achieving a punchy scene here and there only to have its effect nullified by an unintentionally funny line of dialogue or an inconsistent characterization." Gary Arnold of The Washington Post wrote that "the continuity is so punchy that one can't be certain what the filmmakers wanted the story to mean. The smartest lines and most effective situations suggest an entertaining polemic about unscrupulous, ruinous exploitation. But the concept seems to have been victimized by a combination of cold feet, cross-purposes and desperate last-minute editing, which eliminated substantial pieces of exposition along with one major player, Jessica Walter, who is still listed in the credits." Jack Kroll wrote in Newsweek, "Goldengirl fumbles a good story idea, or several good story ideas ... A film that might have had the excitement of Olympic competition and the fun of clever science-fiction founders in dump scenes, Joseph Sargent's heavy-handed direction and some awkward editing which apparently eliminated a pivotal scene showing Serafin's background in Nazi-like medical experimentation."

The film was a box office flop, earning $3 million in North American rentals against a $7 million budget.

See also
The Bionic Woman, a 1976-1978 television series

References

External links

1979 films
1970s science fiction drama films
American science fiction drama films
1970s sports films
Sports films
Running films
Embassy Pictures films
1970s English-language films
Films scored by Bill Conti
Films about the 1980 Summer Olympics
Films about Olympic track and field
Films based on science fiction novels
Films directed by Joseph Sargent
Films set in 1980
Films set in Moscow
1979 drama films
Films produced by Elliott Kastner
1970s American films